Jerold Duane 'Jerry' Gillespie (November 13, 1950 – April 1, 2011) was an American businessman and politician.

Gillespie lived in Mesa, Arizona and was involved in the insurance business. Gillespie was elected to the Arizona Senate and was a Republican. He served in the senate from 1988 until 1990.  His obituary described him as a conservative.

References

Republican Party Arizona state senators
2011 deaths
1950 births
Politicians from Mesa, Arizona
Businesspeople from Arizona
20th-century American businesspeople